Aymen Attou (born October 8, 1997) is an Algerian footballer who plays for USM Khenchela in the Algerian Ligue Professionnelle 1.

Club career
On June 14, 2017, Attou made his senior debut as a starter in a league match against DRB Tadjenanet.

In 2018, Attou signed a contract with WA Tlemcen.

In 2021, Attou signed a contract with MC Alger.

References

External links
 

1997 births
Algeria under-23 international footballers
Algerian footballers
Algerian Ligue Professionnelle 1 players
Living people
Association football fullbacks
ES Sétif players
WA Tlemcen players
21st-century Algerian people
USM Khenchela players